Pioneer Gym is a 2,500 seat multi-purpose arena in Hayward, California built in 1967. It is the home of the California State University, East Bay Pioneers men's and women's basketball teams and women's volleyball team.

See also
Pioneer Amphitheatre
Pioneer Stadium

References

External links
Pioneers basketball website

College basketball venues in the United States
Basketball venues in California
Volleyball venues in California
California State University, East Bay
Buildings and structures in Hayward, California